Jimmy Engoulvent (born 7 December 1979) is a French former road racing cyclist, who competed professionally between 2001 and 2015 for the , ,  and  teams.

Career
Born in Le Mans, Engoulvent was a prologue time trial specialist, having won many prologues throughout his professional career, he also specialised in small field sprints. He was the lanterne rouge of the 2012 Tour de France, as he finished last of the 153 riders to complete the Tour.

Engoulvent joined  for the 2014 season, after his previous team –  – folded at the end of the 2013 season.

Major results

2001
 8th Overall Le Triptyque des Monts et Châteaux
2002
 2nd Grand Prix de la Ville de Lillers
2003
 1st Stage 2b Tour de la Somme
 6th Grand Prix de Denain
 7th Grand Prix Rudy Dhaenens
2004
 3rd Overall Tour du Poitou-Charentes
 3rd Tartu GP
 8th Overall Volta ao Algarve
 8th Grand Prix d'Ouverture La Marseillaise
 9th Le Samyn
2005
 3rd Cholet-Pays de Loire
 10th Eindhoven Team Time Trial
2006
 Tour Méditerranéen
1st Mountains classification
1st Stage 3 (TTT)
 3rd Overall Tour de Picardie
2007
 1st Prologue La Tropicale Amissa Bongo Ondimbo
 1st Prologue Tour de Luxembourg
 8th Eindhoven Team Time Trial
 9th Grand Prix de Denain
2008
 3rd Grand Prix de Denain
 5th Overall Delta Tour Zeeland
 8th Overall Tour Ivoirien de la Paix
1st Stage 4
2009
 1st Stage 2 Four Days of Dunkirk
 1st Stage 4 Tour Alsace
 1st Stage 3 Circuito Montañés
 1st Stage 4 Tour de Gironde
 4th Overall Tour de Bretagne
1st Stage 5
 6th Overall Circuit de la Sarthe
1st Stage 3 (ITT)
 8th Overall Tour de Picardie
 9th Overall Les 3 Jours de Vaucluse
1st Stage 2
2010
 1st Overall Tour du Poitou-Charentes
1st Stage 3
 1st Prologue Tour de Luxembourg
 1st Prologue Boucles de la Mayenne
 1st Prologue Volta a Portugal
 8th Val d'Ille Classic
 10th Tro-Bro Léon
2011
 1st Prologue Vuelta a Andalucía
 7th Overall Driedaagse van West-Vlaanderen
 10th Binche–Tournai–Binche
2012
 1st Overall Four Days of Dunkirk
1st Stage 3
 1st Prologue Tour de Luxembourg
 3rd Flèche d'Emeraude
2013
 1st Prologue Tour de Luxembourg
2014
 1st Stage 5 Four Days of Dunkirk
 1st Prologue Boucles de la Mayenne
 6th Cholet-Pays de Loire
2015
 4th Tro-Bro Léon

Grand Tour general classification results timeline

References

External links
Profile at Crédit Agricole official website

Palmares on CyclingBase (French)

1979 births
Living people
French male cyclists
Sportspeople from Le Mans
Cyclists from Pays de la Loire
Directeur sportifs
21st-century French people